Pamela Brown is the name of:
 Pamela Brown (actress) (1917–1975), English actress
 Pamela Brown, actress daughter of Kentucky politician John Y. Brown, Sr. and passenger of the ill-fated balloon Free Life that attempted to cross the Atlantic in 1970
 Pamela Brown (writer) (1924–1989), British writer
 Pamela Brown (journalist) (born 1983), American television reporter and newscaster
 Pam Brown (born 1948), Australian poet
 Pam Brown (Nebraska politician) (1952–2011), Nebraska state senator
 "Pamela Brown" (song), song by Tom T. Hall